Harish Khanna is an Indian actor who appears mainly in Indian and foreign language films. He is best known for his performances in Yahaan, Kaminey, Midnight’s Children, and Gangs of Wasseypur.

Early life and education 

Khanna was born in Kota, Rajasthan into a Khatri family. He completed his junior school from Delhi and high school from Luthra Academy and Model School (MIER), Jammu. Thereafter he went on to pursue his graduation in acting from National School of Drama, New Delhi. On completion of his graduation in 1993, he moved to Mumbai and started working as an actor in both theater and films together. He received the Charles Wales India Trust Award in the year 1999–2000 to pursue his studies in the UK at Central School of Speech & Drama, London, where he completed a certificate course in MA Performance Studies and Voice Studies.

Theatre career 

Khanna started working in theater as an actor with Natrang in Jammu and Kashmir. He has traveled widely with his performances to countries including Germany, Japan, and Brazil. Some of his performances were Hooriya directed by Anamika Haksar (1997); Sundari: An Actor Prepares and Makeup (2002) by Anuradha Kapur (1998); Odysseus in A Ramayan Odyssey by Jatinder Verma of Tara Arts, London; No Boat in Sight by Makoto Sato and Anuradha Kapur (2002); The Antigone Project by Ein Lall and Anuradha Kapur (2003). He received acclaim for his performance in Glass House Project where he spent 15 days in a glass house. It was an initiative by National School of Drama for 10th Bharat Rang Mahotsava. He directed the Garbage Project which was showcased in 13th Bharat Rang Mahotsava (International Theatre Festival) organized by National School of Drama in 2011. Another project is Surviving Survival Vienna Wiener Festwochen 2011. Khanna has conducted several workshops on voice, speech and acting in India and abroad. Among the cities he has worked in are Jammu, Srinagar, Mandi, Chandigarh, Guwahati, Pune, and Delhi in India; and Daegu and Tokyo in South Korea and Japan respectively. He is also a visiting faculty at the National School of Drama and Department of Indian Theatre, Panjab University. Khanna was also involved in theater therapy programs initiated by the Rajiv Gandhi Foundation in Jammu and Kashmir for three years.

Acting career 

Khanna made his silver screen acting debut with Memories of Fear directed by Madhusree Dutta in 1995. He went on to work with directors like Govind Nihalani, Milan Luthria, Shoojit Sircar, Vishal Bhardwaj, Anurag Kashyap and Tigmanshu Dhulia. Some of his notable performances came with films like Sanshodhan (1996), Hazaar Chaurasi Ki Maa (1998), Kachhe Dhaage (1999), Charas (2004), Yahaan (2005), Kaminey (2009), 7 Khoon Maaf (2011) and Gangs of Wasseypur (2012). Anurga Kashyap gave him special mention at the beginning of Gangs of Wasseypur 2 for his outstanding performance in Gangs of Wasseypur. After his performances in films like 7 Khoon Maaf, Gangs of Wasseypur and Haraamkhor, he became a cult actor of India. He was seen in Netflix original film Rajma Chawal, directed by Leena Yadav, and received applaud for his performance in Bollywood film Sonchiriya directed by Abhishek Chaubey. Apart from Bollywood ventures has worked in British-Swedish film Trishna directed by Michael Winterbottom. Apart from films, Khanna appears in commercials regularly. Some of his notable commercials are paytm "Khushiyo ko Recharge Karo!" and "Friends Adult Diaper-Mother's Day".

Personal life 

Khanna belongs to a middle-class family hailing from Jammu. His parents migrated from Lahore to Delhi and lived in different cities before they finally settled in Jammu during early 1980s. He has one brother and one sister. Being a nature lover, he loves to travel to the mountains and interacting with people. He is fluent in Hindi, Urdu, Panjabi and English.

Filmography

References

External links 
 

Living people
Date of birth missing (living people)
Year of birth missing (living people)
Indian film actors
People from Rajasthan
Punjabi people
Punjabi Hindus
Indian theatre people
National School of Drama alumni
Actors in Hindi cinema